Sarah Brightman Sings the Music of Andrew Lloyd Webber is a 1992 full-length album released in conjunction with Sarah Brightman's world tour The Music of Andrew Lloyd Webber. The album contains most of the songs performed regularly on that tour and features all-new recordings, with the exception of "Pie Jesu", "All I Ask of You", "The Phantom of the Opera", "Anything but Lonely", and "Amigos Para Siempre (Friends for Life)". The album was re-released in Japan with a different cover and peaked #242 in the Oricon charts.

Track listing

Chart performance

References

Sarah Brightman albums
1992 albums
Albums produced by Andrew Lloyd Webber
Albums produced by Nigel Wright